The Rison Cities Service Station is a historic automobile service station at Main and Magnolia Streets in Rison, Arkansas.  It is a distinctive modest brick English Revival structure built in 1938.  It has a cross-gable roof, in which there is a small oculus in each of the gables.  The front facade has large plate glass windows flanking a central doorway.  It was built and operated by the Arkansas Fuel and Oil Company, which operated it from 1938 to 1969 as a Cities Service station.  Since then it has been seen various commercial uses.

The building was listed on the National Register of Historic Places in 2001.

See also
Rison Texaco Service Station, a former Art Deco station just up the road
National Register of Historic Places listings in Cleveland County, Arkansas

References

Gas stations on the National Register of Historic Places in Arkansas
Tudor Revival architecture in Arkansas
Commercial buildings completed in 1938
National Register of Historic Places in Cleveland County, Arkansas
Citgo
1938 establishments in Arkansas
Transportation in Cleveland County, Arkansas